Joseph Maluki Mwongela (born 7 April 1968) is a Kenyan Roman Catholic prelate who serves as Bishop of the Roman Catholic Diocese of Kitui. He was appointed as bishop of Kitui on 17 March 2020.

Background and priesthood
Joseph Mwongela was born on 7 April 1968, in Kakumi Village, in the Diocese of Kitui, in present-day Kitui County. He was ordained a priest on 7 September 1996. He served as a priest of the Diocese of Kitui, until 17 March 2020.

As bishop
Mwongela was appointed Bishop of Kitui on 17 March 2020 and was consecrated a bishop at Kitui on 29 August 2020 by Archbishop Hubertus Matheus Maria van Megen, Titular Archbishop of Novaliciana and Papal Nuncio to Kenya at that time, assisted by Cardinal John Njue, Archbishop of Archdiocese of Nairobi and Archbishop  Anthony Muheria, Archbishop of Archdiocese of Nyeri.

Bishop Mwongela succeeds as bishop of the Kitui Diocese from Archbishop Anthony Muheria, of Nyeri Archdiocese, who was the apostolic administrator over Kitui diocese after he was transferred by the Pope to the Archdiocese of Nyeri in April 2017.

References

External links
 About the Roman Catholic Diocese of Kitui

1968 births
Living people
People from Kitui County
21st-century Roman Catholic bishops in Kenya
Roman Catholic bishops of Kitui